Francis Xavier Herbert (January 11, 1931 – September 25, 2018) was an American school teacher and Democratic Party politician who served a single term on the New Jersey Senate where he represented the 39th Legislative District. He is the only candidate in New Jersey history to win a Federal primary election as a write-in candidate.

Biography
Herbert was born January 11, 1931, in Greenville, Jersey City, New Jersey to a working class, Irish Catholic family. Herbert received his bachelor's degree from Fordham University, in 1956,  and his master's degree in education from Montclair State University. He taught English at the William L. Dickinson High School in Jersey City from September 1956 at least through June 1960.

Herbert lost his first race for office running for the Borough Council in Waldwick, but ran again the next year and won. In the wake of anti-Republican sentiment against Richard Nixon, Herbert won a seat on the Bergen County Board of Chosen Freeholders in 1973, but lost the seat when he ran for re-election in 1976.

With Brendan Byrne at the top of the ticket winning the race for Governor of New Jersey, Herbert won the 1977 race for Senate in the 39th District, standing together with his running mates in support of the establishment of a state income tax to defeat Republican John Markert. Herbert was the sponsor of the Bill that created NJ Transit, the statewide public transit agency, in July 1979.

Gerald Cardinale defeated the incumbent Herbert in 1981. Herbert fell short again running against Cardinale in 1983,losing by about 1,000 votes.

In 1994, Democratic Party officials asked Herbert, then a resident of Sparta Township, to run in the primary against John Kucek in New Jersey's 11th congressional district. Kucek proclaimed himself as a "Christian populist" was a Holocaust denier and a public admirer of KKK Grand Wizard David Duke. New Jersey Democratic chairman Tom Byrne was elated by the success of the write-in campaign for Herbert that was organized in conjunction with Jewish organizations in the district, saying that "the first thing we had to do was convince people not to vote for the Nazi" before convincing voters to cast a write-in ballot for Herbert. In the general election Herbert  lost resoundingly to Republican Rodney Frelinghuysen by a margin of 71.2%-28.0%,

By then a resident of Rockaway Township, Herbert won the Democratic primary for the party's state senate nomination in the 25th Legislative District in 2007. Campaigning on a platform that included a proposal to use a portion of revenue from the states toll roads to fund lower fares on New Jersey Transit and opposing Bucco's vote against state funding for stem cell research, Herbert lost to incumbent Anthony Bucco by 61.5%-38.5%.

He was married to the former Eleanor Gillen and has three adult children. He died at the age of 87 on September 25, 2018.

References

1931 births
2018 deaths
County commissioners in New Jersey
Democratic Party New Jersey state senators
Politicians from Jersey City, New Jersey
Politicians from Bergen County, New Jersey
People from Rockaway Township, New Jersey
People from Sparta, New Jersey
People from Waldwick, New Jersey
Fordham University alumni
Montclair State University alumni
Schoolteachers from New Jersey